Mary Diana Dods (1790–1830) was a Scottish writer of books, stories and other works who adopted a male identity. Most of her works appeared under the pseudonym David Lyndsay. In private life she used the name Walter Sholto Douglas. This may have been partly inspired by her grandfather's name, Sholto Douglas, 15th Earl of Morton. She was a close friend and confidante of Mary Shelley, and lived a portion of her life as the husband of Isabella Robinson. In 1980, scholar Betty T. Bennett sensationally revealed that Dods performed both male identities for various literary and personal reasons.

Early life
Apparently illegitimate daughters of George Douglas, the 16th Earl of Morton, Mary Diana Dods and her older sister Georgiana were raised at two residences, one being Dalmahoy House, the seat of her father's Scottish estate, and the other in London.

Education
The success of works published under her male pseudonym of David Lyndsay suggests that Dods had received a substantial education. Education for women was better in Scotland than in England in the 19th century, but still paltry. At most, women learned basic etiquette and household upkeep from hired governesses. Mary's education is attributed to the Scottish parish-school system. Unlike Edinburgh University, parish schools educated both sexes. Another theory is that Mary's father was wealthy enough to provide additional domestic tutors. Another supporting detail in Bennett's research is a letter from Lyndsay to her publisher claiming an education under the "best Masters".

Work
Some dramas of hers appeared in Blackwood's Magazine, as did several of her stories, which have been seen as "very much in the vein of Byron's Oriental tales". Dods, communicating as Lyndsay, admitted to admiring Byron for his writing, but adamantly denied that she plagiarized his work.

Lyndsay made at least six contributions to Blackwood's Magazine. Those confirmed include "The Death of Isaiah – a Fragment", "Horae Gallicae. No. I. Raynouard's States of Blois", "The Mount of Olives, The Plague of Darkness, The Last Plague", "The Ring and the Stream" and "Vigil of St. Mark". Another key work was Dramas of the Ancient World, written at William Blackwood's invitation, which appeared in 1822 as written by David Lyndsay. Tales of the Wild and the Wonderful (1825) was published anonymously, with support from Lyndsay's close friend Mary Shelley. This contributed to the then-current popularization of German fairy-tales.

Dods, as David Lyndsay, rose in her lifetime to the higher literary circles of England and of France. She seems to have been acquainted with General Lafayette, Lord Byron and Frances Wright. She explained her use of pseudonyms to her father in a letter of 26 June 1822: "I sometimes, about once a quarter, write a criticism for the Reviewers upon some popular work, any that happen to be the fashion, for which, I am esteem'd one of the cleverest and keenest of that race of Vipers. I am paid tolerably well, ten Guineas per sheet, but this not under my own name. I dare not acknowledge the Fact lest the angry Authors whose works I am compelled to maul in the course of my vocation should return the compliment and maul me in return."

Writing as an ostensibly male author in the early 19th century gave Dods invaluable freedom. As a young woman her wealthy father had often ignored her petitions for money – her sister Georgiana was typically given a larger sum and more often. This shows that Mary's father did not trust her financial responsibility in the same way as her sister's, a limitation that kept both young women in perpetual debt. The debt receipts and bills, however, provide much evidence for the research on Mary in relation to her false personae – Lyndsay and Douglas. Writing as Lyndsay, Mary developed her literary ingenuity and avoided the constraints of working in the more socially acceptable role of a governess. Through her writing she began to reach into the literary circles of Lord Byron and Mary Shelley. The letters of Mary Shelley, the original focus of Bennett's research, reveal details of both the male identities Dods adopted in her life and career.

Identity
Dods's original pseudonym was David Lyndsay, for the purpose of supporting herself as a writer while living with her sister Georgiana Carter. Carter's husband died soon after their marriage and the sisters lived together in London. In August 1821, the first of many letters appeared between Lyndsay and the publisher of Blackwood's Magazine, William Blackwood. As Lyndsay, Dods received criticism and praise for her published work in the magazine. She was recognized as a good, well-read writer by the magazine's critics. In 1822, letters began to make mention of a liver disease that occupied Lyndsay and prevented her work from being completed on time.

These correspondences reveal some biographical detail. Dods, writing as Lyndsay, relates details such as her Scottish heritage, her linguistic prowess, and the fact that she is a good critic of theatre performance. The connection between Dods and her male persona is clear: Dods was noted as linguistically gifted in her social spheres, and fluent in French, German, Italian, Latin, and Spanish. Other small details support the relationship; both Dods and Lyndsay in separate letters relate a difficult and demanding relationship with their father.

Second identity
Dods also lived under the male identity of a diplomat and scholar whom she named Walter Sholto Douglas, ostensibly the spouse of one Isabella Robinson and a friend of Mary Shelley. The marriage was concocted in part as a veil for Robinson's illegitimate pregnancy. When the child was born, Dods and Robinson named the little girl Adeline Douglas; when she married Henry Drummond Wolff in 1853, Adeline cited her late father as "Walter Sholto Douglas". Correspondence between Dods and Jane Williams in the mid-1820s suggests they too had close relations.

In 1827 Shelley helped Dods and Robinson obtain false passports enabling them to travel to Paris as Mr and Mrs Douglas. The description of Douglas for the passport has "him" as short with dark curly hair and dark eyes. In a book by Eliza Rennie, biographer of Mary Shelley, Dods is described similarly: "Very sharp and piercing black eyes, a complexion extremely pale and unhealthy... her figure was short... (Dod's hair) cropped, curly, short, and thick." Rennie adds that at first glance, Dods appears as "someone of the masculine gender".

However, these similarities support rather than prove the identity. In another section of her Shelley book, Rennie writes, "'Miss Dods' was an alias for Mr. ---." This provides strong confirmation that Rennie knew the alternative identities of Dods.

Letters between Mary Shelley and literary acquaintances intimate similar truths about Dods's identity. Because Shelley corresponded with both Lyndsay and Dods, the obvious similarity in their handwriting confirms their identity as a single writer. One clue comes in a letter Shelley wrote with a large blank space originally indicating to critics that she had simply discontinued one sentence and begun another. However, the phrase is continuous and states, "pray console dear Doddy for [blank space] she is very sorrowful & has reason to be so." Reading the rest of Shelley and Lyndsay's letters in hindsight, and other letters to literary friends, Bennett confirms the female identity of both Douglas and Lyndsay.

Moustache and whiskers
Later in life Dods suffered further attacks of liver disease and other unnamed mental and physical illnesses. There is no clear evidence as to whether the relations between Dods and Isabella were romantic, but that is not impossible. The decline in Dods' mental and physical wellbeing coincided with separation from Isabella for a substantial period. After a lifetime of financial struggle and debt, Douglas ended in a debtor's prison. While there she asked a friend to have a moustache and whiskers brought to her, in the contemporary style. This indicates less a preoccupation with keeping up the male identity than Dods's need for one. Living as a woman had not worked for her and she was undergoing ruin as a man.

Dods is thought to have died of her ailments between November 1829 and November 1830, after several months in prison.

Legacy
Lady Adeline Douglas Wolff's secret stories of how her mother Isabella Robinson's first "husband" switched genders for literary and personal gain might have appealed to her own daughter, the rebellious author Adeline Georgiana Isabel Kingscote, who published several of her first novels under the male pseudonym Lucas Cleve.

See also
List of pen names
List of Scottish short story writers
List of Scottish writers

References

Bibliography
Betty T. Bennett. Mary Diana Dods, a Gentleman and a Scholar. Johns Hopkins University Press.
Mary Diana Dods. [www.worldcat.org/identities/lccn-n82225931/. Elizabeth L.; Innes, Sue. The Biographical Dictionary of Scottish Women (hardcover)]
David Lyndsay. [http://www.worldcat.org/identities/lccn-n2012007102/.]
Christopher Oldstone-Moore. "The Beard Movement in Victorian Britain". Victorian Studies, vol. 48/1, 2005, pp. 7–34. JSTOR, www.jstor.org/stable/3829878
Lorna Sage. Cambridge Guide to Women’s Writing in English. Norwich, University of East Anglia, October 1999

Place of birth missing
Place of death missing
1790 births
1830 deaths
Scottish diplomats
Scottish women poets
Scottish scholars and academics
19th-century Scottish women writers
British women short story writers
Pseudonymous women writers
Scottish short story writers
19th-century British short story writers
Scottish LGBT poets
Scottish lesbian writers
Lesbian poets
Female-to-male cross-dressers
19th-century Scottish LGBT people
19th-century pseudonymous writers